YTL PowerSeraya Pte. Limited is an electricity producer in Singapore, generating about 30% of the country’s energy needs. The company also offers oil trading and storage services. Its core business with a licensed generating capacity of 3,100MW is situated on Jurong Island.  YTL PowerSeraya sells electricity to customers through its retail arm, Seraya Energy, and manages fuel purchases through its oil trading arm, PetroSeraya. Its corporate office is located at Alexandra Road.

Originally part of Singapore Power, the company was part of Temasek Holdings from 2001. On 6 March 2009, the company was divested from Temasek Holdings to become a wholly owned subsidiary of YTL Power International Berhad. The legal name is YTL PowerSeraya Pte. Limited.

PetroSeraya
PetroSeraya Pte Ltd, a subsidiary of PowerSeraya Limited, was established in April 2007. Its establishment forms part of PowerSeraya's diversification strategy to move into the non-regulated business and complements its core business of energy wholesaling and retailing. PetroSeraya plays a key role in managing PowerSeraya's fuel purchases – which form a significant component in the generation cost – as well as optimising the parent company's existing fuel management assets, such as tanks and jetties.

References

External links
YTL PowerSeraya
Geneco (by Seraya Energy)
PetroSeraya

See also
 Energy law

Electric power companies of Singapore